Highway 717 is a highway in the Canadian province of Saskatchewan. It runs from Highway 2 near Assiniboia to Highway 334 near Kayville.

It also connects with Highway 624.

See also 
Roads in Saskatchewan
Transportation in Saskatchewan

References 

717